Fainga'a is a surname of Tongan origin. It may refer to :

Anthony Fainga'a (born 1987), Australian Rugby Union player, twin brother of Saia Fainga'a
Saia Fainga'a (born 1987), Australian Rugby Union player, twin brother of Anthony Fainga'a
Vili Fainga'a (born 1988), Australian Rugby Union player, younger brother of Saia and Anthony Fainga'a
Colby Fainga'a (born 1991), Australian Rugby Union player, younger brother of Anthony, Saia and Vili Fainga'a

Folau Fainga'a (born 1995), Australian Rugby Union player

Tongan-language surnames